The 1969 Paris–Nice was the 27th edition of the Paris–Nice cycle race and was held from 10 March to 16 March 1969. The race started in Paris and finished in Nice. The race was won by Eddy Merckx of the Faema team.

General classification

References

1969
1969 in road cycling
1969 in French sport
March 1969 sports events in Europe
1969 Super Prestige Pernod